Danish billiards or keglebillard, sometimes called Danish five-pin billiards, is the traditional cue sport of Denmark, and the game remains predominantly played in that country. It makes use of a 5 × 10 ft (approximately 1.5 × 3 m) six-pocket table, three billiard balls, and five , which are considerably larger than those used in the similar and internationally standardized (originally Italian) game of five-pin billiards.

Rules

The game is played with one red ball and two white balls. There are two ways to score points. One is by knocking over one or more of the pins, for 2 points each, with a white object ball after hitting the white with the red cue ball (i.e. a  ball-to-pin shot). The other is by "making red", that is, to have the cue ball hit both object balls, which gives 4 points. 

It is a foul if the cue ball topples a pin or leaves the table, whether by a pocket or over the edge. A white ball leaving the table is not a foul. The second consecutive shot where red is not made and no ball touches a cushion is a foul. The third consecutive shot where no pin falls is a foul. The only effect of a foul is that the shot counts 0, ending the player's turn at the table.

Svensk kægle
Svensk kægle ('Swedish pin') is a variation that has more in common with Italian five-pins: the optimal shot is to knock over the "king" pin (standing in the center of the pins) without toppling any other pins.

References

Carom billiards
Obstacle billiards
Sport in Denmark